Lycaeidae is a family of crustaceans belonging to the order Amphipoda.

Genera:
 Lycaea Dana, 1852
 Simorhynchotus Stebbing, 1888

References

Amphipoda